Chik-Yelga (Sikyılğa) is a rural locality (a village) in Arkh-Latyshsky Selsoviet, Arkhangelsky District, Bashkortostan, Russia. The population was 63 as of 2010. There are 8 streets.

Geography 
Chik-Yelga is located 19 km south of Arkhangelskoye (the district's administrative centre) by road. Priuralovka is the nearest rural locality.

References 

Rural localities in Arkhangelsky District